I Write It Down is the eleventh studio album by American country music artist Ed Bruce. It was released in 1982 via MCA Records. The album includes the singles "Ever, Never Lovin' You" and "My First Taste of Texas".

Track listing

Chart performance

References

1982 albums
Ed Bruce albums
Albums produced by Tommy West (producer)
MCA Records albums